The dusky antechinus (Antechinus swainsonii), also known as Swainson's antechinus or the dusky marsupial mouse, is a species of small marsupial carnivore, a member of the family Dasyuridae. It is found in Australia.

Taxonomy

The dusky antechinus was described by English naturalist George Robert Waterhouse in 1840, the second antechinus to be described. It was named in honour of the zoologist and artist William Swainson. There are three subspecies:
A. s. swainsonii, found in Tasmania;
A. s. insulanus, found in the Grampians National Park, Victoria;
A. s. mimetes, found from south-eastern Queensland through eastern New South Wales to south-western Victoria.

Description

The dusky antechinus is the largest antechinus and can be found in two forms: a dark form and a pale form. It can be distinguished from its relatives by its much darker fur, which is also apparent in the pale form. Unusually for an antechinus, it is an entirely diurnal animal, and is active at many times of the day. It mostly eats invertebrates, although it will occasionally devour small lizards and skinks. Like all antechinuses, the dusky antechinus has a short and vigorous mating season (which occurs during winter), after which nearly all of the males die. However, compared to the other antechinus species whose male individuals are almost invariably semelparous and females usually so, iteroparity is more commonly seen in the present species (perhaps due to its comparatively large size). The dusky antechinus is also known for being unusually vocal for an antechinus, and has been observed hissing and chattering.

Distribution and habitat

The dusky antechinus is found from southeastern Queensland to southwestern Victoria in Australia, and is also found in Tasmania. It is most common in mountainous regions, including Kosciuszko National Park and the Brindabella Ranges, where they are found in alpine heath or tall open forest with a dense understorey. The species is not threatened, but local populations have been reduced by controlled burning and the instigation of pine plantations in the place of native forests. The cat and the red fox are also believed to be detrimental to local populations.

References

External links
 Museum Victoria Dusky Antechinus information sheet

Dasyuromorphs
Marsupials of Australia
Mammals of Tasmania
Mammals of New South Wales
Mammals of Victoria (Australia)
Taxa named by George Robert Waterhouse
Mammals described in 1840